Sexarbores is a Gallic god known only from inscriptions found in the Hautes-Pyrénées. Like the gods Abellio and Fagus, it could have been a deified tree.

Etymology 
Sexarbores can be translated as "six-trees", so Sexarbores would be the god of six trees.

Inscriptions 
Sexarbores is only known from inscriptions found in the Pays d'Aspet, around Castelbiague and Arbas in France, whose forest probably fed the wood needs of the nearby city. Unlike most votive monuments of this region of Haute-Garonne, the altars in question give the names of divinities translated into Latin. Sexarbores seems to have been honored solely or mainly by Roman citizens, perhaps woodcutters.
 CIL, XIII, 129 (Arbas) : 
 CIL, XIII, 132 (Castelbiague) : 
 CIL, XIII, 175 (Castelbiague) :

Sources 
 R.Sablayrolles, Les dieux des bucherons à l'époque de la domination romaine, Protoindustrie et histoire des forêts, Actes du colloque (Loubière, 10-13 octobre 1990) dans Les Cahiers de l'Isard, Toulouse, 1992, P 15-26

References 

Gaulish gods
Nature gods
Tree gods
Hautes-Pyrénées